Judith ‘Joe’ Dipodiputro is an Indonesian societal activist and public diplomacy professional.

Judith Dipodiputro came to public attention in 1988 for her involvement as executive director of PPIP, an organization established under the patronage at the Ministry of Foreign Affairs by Francisco Xavier do Amaral, Lopes da Cruz, E.M. Tomodok and Josef Muskita. PPIP sought public support for the resolution of political differences between the Indonesian and Portuguese governments on East Timor, while running welfare-creation initiatives for rural communities in the province.

A supporter of Saya Perempuan Anti Korupsi (SPAK), together with a number of other prominent women, former oil and gas executives and social activists, Dipodiputro advocates the establishment of a Direktorat Pengembalian Uang Negara Pada Sektor MIGAS within the Indonesian Corruption Eradication Commission (KPK).

Dipodiputro started promoting decentralization of authority from central government to regional governments when she was assistant to Ikhyar Musa, Chairman of the then Badan Koordinasi Otomatisasi Aparatur Negara, under the Ministry of State Apparatus. She became involved in the Pro-LH project, where regional governments of East Kalimantan, Central Kalimantan and South Kalimantan became prototypes for decentralization of authority in environmental management. Base of the result of these prototypes was the promulgation of Keputusan Presiden No. 97/1995.

She served as Special Assistant (Staff Khusus) to the Governor of South Kalimantan and the Vice Governor of Central Kalimantan; and as Special Advisor (Staff Ahli) to Bupati of Kutai Kartanegara. Intensely involved in integrating programs and budgets of government, private, scientific and aid agencies, organizations or institutions, with aim to allow strong permanent access to national and global value-chains, as the most responsible and effective approach to poverty alleviation.

Dipodiputro has been a low-profile environmental activist for more than 30 years. She was involved in the establishment of Kalpawilis Foundation (1995) where senior environmentalists such as Hadi Alikodra, Effendy, Nabil Makarim, Sarwono Kusumaatmadja were on its board. Currently she serves as Deputy Chairman of the Javan Gibbon Foundation and was one of the initiators of the 2012 petition signed by 62 NGOs who stand to withhold the protection of forests and ecosystems as a human right.

Dipodiputro's voluntarism in electoral campaigns started in Kutai Kartangara with her involvement in the electoral team which brought Syaukani Hassan Rais to become the first head of regional government in Indonesia to be elected through direct-elections, in 2005. In support of Ir. H. Joko Widodo's presidential campaign of 2014, she co-established the Luhur Bakti Pertiwi foundation (in 2012), Bravo-5, Relawan Industri MIGAS, Relawan Atlet dan Komunitas Olahraga; was also advisor to Relawan GK Center. She categorizes those involved in government affairs and electoral work into two categories: politicians and professionals. She believes that professionalism is the antidote to "irresponsible arrangements" and dirty/black campaign largely seen in Indonesia's electoral politics today.

In the private sector, Dipodiputro has held senior positions in Standard Chartered Bank, PT Citra Lamtorogung Persada, PT Citra Televisi Pendidikan Indonesia, and PT Indoexchange Tbk. She was also Chief Editor of the Daily Executive Economic Digest.

Before her assignment as Special Advisor to the Minister of State Owned Enterprises, she was vice president for Corporate Communications, CSR and Operations Support of TOTAL E&P Indonesie.

While on a voluntary basis served as Chairman of Pokja Papua, established in 2014 by Kantor Transisi Pemerintahan Jokowi-JK. Pokja Papua advocates and chaperones the inclusion of women, marginalized and indigenous communities of the Papua and West Papua provinces into the Indonesian economy.

Dipodiputro studied at The Faculty of Literature and Civilizations, University of Indonesia and was an IDEAS fellow at the Massachusetts Institute of Technology. She also attended the Senior Executive Formation Course at LEMHANNAS.

References

Indonesian activists
Indonesian women activists
Living people
Indonesian environmentalists
Indonesian women environmentalists
1964 births